Assassin for Hire is a 1951 British crime film directed by Michael McCarthy and starring Sydney Tafler, Ronald Howard and Katharine Blake. Its plot follows a contract killer who becomes stricken with remorse when he is led to believe he has murdered his brother.

It was the first feature film made by Anglo-Amalgamated. It was made at Merton Park Studios from a screenplay by Rex Rienits. It was intended as a supporting feature, although it may have been shown as a headline feature in some cinemas.

Plot
Antonio Riccardi, a young British criminal of Italian heritage, works as a professional contract killer in order to pay for his gifted younger brother's violin lessons so that he can escape from a life of poverty and crime. A series of mistakes lead him to wrongly believe he has killed his brother, and he confesses his crimes to the police.

Cast
 Sydney Tafler – Antonio Riccardi 
 Ronald Howard – Detective Inspector Carson 
 Katharine Blake – Maria Riccardi 
 John Hewer – Giuseppe Riccardi 
 June Rodney – Helen Garrett 
 Gerald Case – Detective Sergeant Stott 
 Reginald Dyson – Josef Meyerling 
 Sam Kydd – Bert 
 Ian Wallace – Charlie 
 Martin Benson – Catesby 
 Ewen Solon – Fred

Original Radio Play
Rex Rienits originally wrote the story as a radio play, which aired in Australia in 1944 in a production starring Keith Eden. Another version was produced in 1952.

Television Play
Rienits moved to London in April 1949 and in May 1950 reported he had sold the script to television. It was one of two television scripts he sold, the other being The Million Pound Note which would be filmed in 1954.

The television film Assassin for Hire was screened by the BBC in September 1950 with Sidney Tafler in the lead.

Film production
In November 1950 Rienits reported that film rights to his story had been purchased by Anglo Amalgamated, run by Nat Cohen. Filming started at Merton Studios on 13 November 1950 with Tafler repeating his television performance.

Dallas Bower who directed the television version claims the movie "more or less started Nat Cohen off in the film industry because he decided he wanted to make this into a film and indeed he did" and "it made a mint of money." Bower thought Assassin for Hire might have been "the first occasion when a successful TV production also became a successful film."

Novel

Rienits later turned the story into a novel. It was published along with the Rienits short story Wide Boy which was later filmed with Sidney Tafler in 1952. The Herald called the novel Assassin for Hire "a tightly written, quite exciting report on a professional killer." The Advertiser called it "An exciting, if not a very convincing, novel.

There was also talk the story would be turned into a play.

References

Bibliography
 Chibnall, Steve & McFarlane, Brian. The British 'B' Film. Palgrave MacMillan, 2009.

External links
 
Assassin for Hire at BFI

1951 films
1951 crime films
Films directed by Michael McCarthy
1950s English-language films
British crime films
British black-and-white films
1950s British films